The MacPherson Single Member Constituency is a single member constituency located in the central area of Singapore. The current Member of Parliament for the constituency is People's Action Party (PAP) Tin Pei Ling.

History
It existed from 1968 to 1991 as an independent ward, was merged with Marine Parade GRC until 2011, and became an independent SMC again for the 2015 general elections. As of 2020, it retains its status as a SMC.

The ward consists of Circuit/Pipit Road, Geylang East Central, Aljunied Crescent/Avenue 2, Mattar/Merpati Road, Paya Lebar MRT/Square and several areas near MacPherson.

Town Council 

MacPherson SMC is managed by the Marine Parade Town Council.

Members of Parliament

Electoral results

Elections in 1960s

Elections in 1970s

Elections in 1980s

Elections in 1990s

Elections in 2000s

Elections in 2010s

Elections in 2020s

See also
Marine Parade GRC

References
2020 General Election's result
2015 General Election's result
2006 General Election's result
2001 General Election's result
1997 General Election's result
1988 General Election's result
1984 General Election's result
1980 General Election's result
1976 General Election's result
1972 General Election's result
1968 General Election's result

2015 establishments in Singapore
Singaporean electoral divisions
Geylang